Austria competed at the 1904 Summer Olympics in St. Louis, United States. Austrian and Hungarian results at early Olympic Games are generally kept separate despite the union of the two nations as Austria-Hungary at the time.

Austrian gymnast Julius Lenhart, who from 1903 to 1906 worked in America and in 1904 represented the sports club Philadelphia Turngemeinde mainly attended by German speaking gymnasts, won two gold medals and one silver medal, making him the most successful Austrian competitor ever at the Summer Olympic Games.

Medalists

Swimming

References

 Official Olympic Reports
 International Olympic Committee results database

Nations at the 1904 Summer Olympics
1904
Olympics